The Milwaukee-Diversey-Kimball District is an official City of Chicago Landmark District straddling the Chicago community areas of Avondale and Logan Square at the gateway to the Polish Village.  This district includes 7 buildings in the vicinity of the intersection of Milwaukee Avenue, Kimball Avenue, and Diversey Parkway.

The Milwaukee-Diversey-Kimball District was designated a Chicago Landmark on February 9, 2005.

References

External links
 

Historic districts in Chicago
North Side, Chicago
Chicago Landmarks
Polish-American culture in Chicago